Quatermass and the Pit (US title: Five Million Years to Earth) is a 1967 British science fiction horror film from Hammer Film Productions, a sequel to the earlier Hammer films The Quatermass Xperiment and Quatermass 2. Like its predecessors it is based on a BBC Television serial, in this case Quatermass and the Pit, written by Nigel Kneale. It was directed by Roy Ward Baker and stars Andrew Keir in the title role as Professor Bernard Quatermass, replacing Brian Donlevy, who played the role in the two earlier films. James Donald, Barbara Shelley and Julian Glover appear in co-starring roles.

The storyline, which is largely faithful to the original television production, centres on the discovery of a mysterious object buried at the site of an extension to the London Underground. Also uncovered nearby are the remains of early human ancestors more than five million years old. Realising that the object is in fact an ancient Martian spacecraft, Quatermass deduces that the aliens have influenced human evolution and the development of human intelligence. The spacecraft has an intelligence of its own, and once uncovered begins to exert a malign influence, resurrecting Martian memories and instincts buried deep within the human psyche.

Nigel Kneale wrote the first draft of the screenplay in 1961, but difficulties in attracting interest from American co-financiers meant the film did not go into production until 1967. The director, Roy Ward Baker, was chosen because of his experience with technically demanding productions such as A Night to Remember; this was the first of six films that he directed for Hammer. Andrew Keir, playing Quatermass, found making the film an unhappy experience, believing Baker had wanted Kenneth More to play the role. Owing to a lack of space, the film was shot at the MGM-British Studios in Elstree, Borehamwood, rather than Hammer's usual home at the time, which was the Associated British Studios, also in Elstree.

The film opened in November 1967 to favourable reviews, and remains generally well regarded.

Plot
Workers building an extension to the London Underground at Hobbs End dig up an odd-looking skull. Palaeontologist Dr Matthew Roney identifies the skull as a five-million-year-old apeman, more ancient than previous finds. One of Roney's assistants uncovers part of a metallic object nearby. Believing it to be an unexploded bomb from the London blitz, they call in an army bomb disposal team.

Meanwhile, Professor Bernard Quatermass learns that his plans for the colonisation of the Moon are to be taken over by the military, with plans to establish ballistic missile bases in space. He gives a cold reception to Colonel Breen, who has been assigned to Quatermass's British Experimental Rocket Group. When the bomb disposal team call for Breen's assistance, Quatermass accompanies him to the site. Breen concludes the buried object is a V-weapon, but Quatermass disagrees. When another skull is found within a chamber of the "bomb", Quatermass and Roney realise that the object itself must also be five million years old. Noting the object's imperviousness to heat, Quatermass suspects it is of alien origin, but Roney is certain the apemen were terrestrial.

Roney's assistant, Barbara Judd, goes to the site with Quatermass. She becomes intrigued by the name of the area, recalling that "Hob" is an old name for the Devil. A local policeman tells them the legend that the bombed-out house opposite the station is haunted. All three go there to investigate. The policeman is so spooked that he has to leave. A member of the bomb disposal team witnesses a spectral apparition of Roney's apeman appearing through the wall of the object. Quatermass and Barbara find historical accounts of hauntings and other spectral appearances going back many centuries, coinciding with disturbances of the ground around Hobbs End.

An attempt to open a sealed chamber in the object using a Borazon drill fails. A few moments later, however, a small hole is seen, though the drill operator, Sladden, is certain he is not responsible for it. The hole widens to reveal the corpses of three-legged, insectoid creatures with horned heads. An examination of the creatures' physiology suggests they came from Mars. Quatermass and Roney note the similarity between their appearance and images of the Devil, while Quatermass believes the spaceship is the source of the spectral images and disturbances.

Quatermass and Roney reveal their findings to the press, attracting the ire of a government minister who has not sanctioned their statements. Quatermass theorises that the occupants of the spaceship came from a dying Mars. Unable to survive on Earth, they sought to preserve some part of their race by creating a colony by proxy, by significantly enhancing the intelligence of and imparting Martian faculties to the indigenous primitive hominids. Quatermass theorizes the highly advanced alien insectoids used medical and surgical techniques that were far more advanced than even those on present-day Earth. The descendants of these apemen evolved into humans, retaining the vestiges of Martian influence buried in their subconscious. A disbelieving Breen thinks the "alien craft" is Nazi propaganda designed to sow fear among Londoners. The minister believes Breen and decides to unveil the spaceship at a press conference.

Whilst dismantling his drill, Sladden is overcome by a powerful psychic force, and haphazardly runs away. His mind unleashes powerful telekinetic energy displays, disrupting people and property. He finally comes to rest in a church, where Judd and Quatermass find him. Sladden tells Quatermass he saw a vision of hordes of insect creatures under an alien sky. He also relates that he saw himself as one of them and that he felt that he had to desperately run away in fear of his life. Quatermass returns to Hobbs End, bringing a machine Roney has been working on, which taps into the primeval psyche. While trying to replicate the circumstances under which Sladden was affected, he notices that Barbara has fallen under the spaceship's influence. Using Roney's machine, he records her thoughts. Quatermass presents the recording to the minister and other officials. It shows hordes of Martians engaged in what he interprets as a genocidal race purge, to cleanse the Martian hives of all mutations. The minister and Breen dismiss the recording.

Disaster strikes when a power line is dropped within the craft, giving it a massive jolt of electrical energy. The effect and range of the spaceship's influence on those Londoners susceptible to it increases; they go on a rampage, attacking all those perceived as different, with powerful, deadly telekinetic displays of energy. Breen is drawn towards the spaceship and killed by the intense, roasting energy emanating from it. Quatermass falls under the alien control as well, but is snapped out of it by Roney, who is unaffected. The two men realise that a small portion of the population are immune. The psychic energy intensifies, ripping up streets and buildings, while a spectral image of a Martian towers above the city, itself resembling the image of the Devil of legend. Recalling stories about how the Devil could be defeated with iron and water, Roney theorises that the Martian energy can be discharged into the earth. While Quatermass prevents Barbara stopping him, Roney climbs a building crane and swings it into the spectral image. The crane bursts into flames as it discharges the energy, killing Roney. The image and its effects on London disappear. Quatermass and Judd stand amidst the devastation of London, slowly recovering from the personal upheaval the alien energy has wreaked on them.

Cast

 James Donald as Doctor Roney
 Andrew Keir as Professor Bernard Quatermass
 Barbara Shelley as Barbara Judd
 Julian Glover as Colonel Breen
 Edwin Richfield as the Minister

Production

Origins

Professor Bernard Quatermass was introduced to audiences in two BBC television serials, The Quatermass Experiment (1953) and Quatermass II (1955), written by Nigel Kneale. The rights to both these serials were acquired by Hammer Film Productions, and the film adaptations—The Quatermass Xperiment and Quatermass 2, both directed by Val Guest and starring Brian Donlevy as Quatermass—were released in 1955 and 1957, respectively. Kneale went on to write a third Quatermass serial—Quatermass and the Pit—for the BBC, which was broadcast in December 1958 and January 1959. Once again interested in making a film adaptation, Hammer and Kneale, who had by then left the BBC and was working as a freelance screenwriter, completed a script in 1961. It was intended that Val Guest would once again direct and Brian Donlevy would reprise his role of Quatermass, with production to commence in 1963. Securing financing for the new Quatermass film proved difficult. In 1957 Hammer had struck a deal with Columbia Pictures to distribute their pictures, and the companies collaborated on thirty films between 1957 and 1964. Columbia, which was not interested in Quatermass, passed on the script, and the production went into limbo for several years. In 1964 Kneale and Anthony Hinds submitted a revised, lower-budget script to Columbia, but the relationship between Hammer and Columbia had begun to sour and the script was again rejected. In 1966 Hammer entered into a new distribution deal with Seven Arts, ABPC, and Twentieth Century Fox; Quatermass and the Pit finally entered production.

Writing
The script of Quatermass and the Pit is largely faithful to the television original. The plot was condensed to fit the shorter running time of the film, the main casualty being the removal of a subplot involving the journalist James Fullalove. The climax was altered slightly to make it more cinematic, Roney using a crane to short out the Martian influence, whereas in the television version he throws a metal chain into the pit. The setting for the pit was changed from a building site to the London Underground. The closing scene of the television version, in which Quatermass pleads with humanity to prevent Earth becoming the "second dead planet", was also dropped, in favour of a shot of Quatermass and Judd sitting alone amid the devastation wrought by the Martian spacecraft. The script was sent to John Trevelyan of the British Board of Film Censors in December 1966. Trevelyan replied that the film would require an X certificate and complained about the sound of the vibrations from the alien ship, the scenes of the Martian massacre, scenes of destruction and panic as the Martian influence takes hold and the image of the Devil.

Casting
James Donald first came to prominence playing Theo van Gogh in Lust for Life (1956) before going on to play a string of roles in the World War II prisoner of war films The Bridge on the River Kwai (1957), The Great Escape (1963) and King Rat (1965). Although not playing the title role, Donald was accorded top-billing status.

Nigel Kneale had long been highly critical of Brian Donlevy's interpretation of Quatermass and lobbied for the role to be recast, arguing that enough time had passed that audiences would not resist a change of actor. Several actors were considered for the part, including André Morell, who had played Quatermass in the television version of Quatermass and the Pit. Morell was not interested in revisiting a role he had already played. The producers eventually settled on the Scottish actor Andrew Keir, who had appeared in supporting roles in other Hammer productions, including The Pirates of Blood River (1962), The Devil-Ship Pirates (1964) and Dracula: Prince of Darkness (1966). Keir found the shoot an unhappy experience: he later recalled: "The director—Roy Ward Baker—didn't want me for the role. He wanted Kenneth More ... and it was a very unhappy shoot. [...] Normally I enjoy going to work every day. But for seven-and-a-half weeks it was sheer hell." Roy Ward Baker denied he had wanted Kenneth More, who he felt would be "too nice" for the role, saying: "I had no idea he [Keir] was unhappy while we were shooting. His performance was absolutely right in every detail and I was presenting him as the star of the picture. Perhaps I should have interfered more." Keir went on to appear for Hammer in The Viking Queen (1967) and Blood from the Mummy's Tomb (1971). He reprised the role of Quatermass for BBC Radio 3 in The Quatermass Memoirs (1996), making him the only actor other than Donlevy to play the role more than once.

Barbara Shelley was a regular leading lady for Hammer, having appeared in The Camp on Blood Island (1958), Shadow of the Cat (1961), The Gorgon (1964), The Secret of Blood Island (1964), Dracula: Prince of Darkness and Rasputin, the Mad Monk (1966) for them. Quatermass and the Pit was her last film for the company and she subsequently worked in television and the theatre. Roy Ward Baker was particularly taken with his leading lady, telling Bizarre Magazine in 1974 that he was "mad about her in the sense of love. We used to waltz about the set together, a great love affair."

Roy Ward Baker first met Julian Glover when he directed him in an episode of The Avengers ("Two's a Crowd", 1965). Baker said of Glover's performance: "He turned in a tremendous character, forceful, autocratic but never over the top." Glover recalled of the role: "I think I was too young for it. [...] I think I played it all right. It was very straightforward. Bit of a stereotype. [...] The obligatory asshole!"

Filming
By the time Quatermass and the Pit finally entered production Val Guest was occupied on Casino Royale (1967), so directing duties went instead to Roy Ward Baker. Baker's first film had been The October Man (1947) and he was best known for The One That Got Away (1957) and A Night to Remember (1958). Following the failure of Two Left Feet (1963), he moved into television, directing episodes of The Human Jungle (1963–64), The Saint (1962–69) and The Avengers. Producer Anthony Nelson Keys chose Baker as director because he felt his experience on such films as A Night to Remember gave him the technical expertise to handle the film's significant special effects requirements. Baker, for his part, felt that his background on fact-based dramas such as A Night to Remember and The One That Got Away enabled him to give Quatermass and the Pit the air of realism it needed to be convincing to audiences. He was impressed by Nigel Kneale's screenplay, feeling the script was "taut, exciting and an intriguing story with excellent narrative drive. It needed no work at all. All one had to do was cast it and shoot it." He was also impressed with Hammer Films' lean set-up: having been used to working for major studios with thousands of full-time employees, he was surprised to find that Hammer's core operation consisted of just five people and enjoyed how this made the decision making process fast and simple. Quatermass and the Pit was the first film for which the director was credited as "Roy Ward Baker", having previously been credited as "Roy Baker". The change was made to avoid confusion with another Roy Baker who was a sound editor. Baker later regretted making the change as many people assumed he was a new director.

Filming took place between 27 February and 25 April 1967. The budget was £275,000 (£ in ). At this time, Hammer was operating out of the Associated British Studios in Elstree, Borehamwood. A lack of space meant that production was relocated to the nearby MGM Borehamwood studio. There were no other productions working at the MGM Studios at this time so the Quatermass crew had full access to all the facilities of the studio. Roy Ward Baker was particularly pleased to be able to use MGM's extensive backlot for the exteriors of the Underground station. The production team included many Hammer regulars, including production designer Bernard Robinson who, as an in-joke, incorporated a poster for Hammer's The Witches (1966) into the dressing of his set for the Hobbs End station. Another Hammer regular was special effects supervisor Les Bowie. Roy Ward Baker recalled he had a row with Bowie, who believed the film was entirely a special effects picture, when he tried to run the first pre-production conference. Bowie's contribution to the film included the Martian massacre scene, which was achieved with a mixture of puppets and live locusts, and model sequences of London's destruction, including the climactic scene of the crane swinging into the Martian apparition.

Music
Tristram Cary was chosen to provide the score for Quatermass and the Pit. He developed an interest in electronic music while serving in the Royal Navy as an electronics expert working on radar during the Second World War. He became a professional composer in 1954, working in film, theatre, radio and television, with credits including The Ladykillers (1955). He said of his assignment: "I was not mad about doing the film because Hammer wanted masses of electronic material and a great deal of orchestral music. But I had three kids, all of which were at fee-paying schools, so I needed every penny I could get!" Cary also recalled that "the main use of electronics in Quatermass, I think, was the violent shaking, vibrating sound that the "thing in the tunnel" gave off ... It was not a terribly challenging sound to do, though I never played it very loud because I didn't want to destroy my speakers—I did have hopes of destroying a few cinema loudspeaker systems, though it never happened." Carey went on to write the score for another Hammer film, Blood from the Mummy's Tomb, in 1971. Several orchestral and electronic cues from the film were released by GDI Records on a compilation titled The Quatermass Film Music Collection. The soundtrack was released on yellow vinyl in the UK for Record Store Day 2017.

Title sequence
The title sequence of Quatermass and the Pit was devised to be evocative. Kim Newman, in his British Film Institute (BFI) monograph about the movie, states: "The words 'Hammer Film Production' appear on a black background. Successive jigsaw-piece cutaways reveal a slightly psychedelic skull. Swirling, infernal images are superimposed on bone—perhaps maps or landscapes—evoking both the red planet Mars and the fires of Hell. Beside this, the title appears in jagged red letters."

Reception

Critical
Quatermass and the Pit premiered on 9 November 1967 and went on general release as a double feature with Circus of Fear on 19 November. It was released in the US as Five Million Years to Earth in March 1968. The critical reception was generally positive. Writing in The Times, John Russell Taylor found that, "after a slowish beginning, which shows up the deficiencies of acting and direction, things really start hopping when a mysterious missile-like object discovered in a London excavation proves to be a relic of a prehistoric Martian attempt (successful, it would seem) to colonize Earth [...] The development of this situation is scrupulously worked out and the film is genuinely gripping even when (a real test this) the Power of Evil is finally shown personified in hazy glowing outline, a spectacle as a rule more likely to provoke titters than gasps of horror." Paul Errol of the Evening Standard described the film as a "well-made, but wordy, blob of hokum", a view echoed by William Hall of The Evening News who described the film as "entertaining hokum" with an "imaginative ending". A slightly more critical view was espoused by Penelope Mortimer in The Observer who said: "This nonsense makes quite a good film, well put together, competently photographed, on the whole sturdily performed. What it totally lacks is imagination."

Box office
According to Fox records, the film required $1.2 million in rentals to break even and made only $881,000 ($ in ).

Legacy
The film was a success for Hammer and they quickly announced that Nigel Kneale was writing a new Quatermass story for them but the script never went further than a few preliminary discussions. Kneale did eventually write a fourth Quatermass story, broadcast as a four-part serial, titled Quatermass, by ITV television in 1979, an edited version of which was also given a limited cinema release under the title The Quatermass Conclusion. Quatermass and the Pit marked the return to directing for the cinema for Roy Ward Baker and he went on to direct such films as The Anniversary (1968), Moon Zero Two (1969), The Vampire Lovers (1970), Scars of Dracula (1970), Dr. Jekyll and Sister Hyde (1971) and The Legend of the 7 Golden Vampires (1974) for Hammer. He also directed Asylum (1972), And Now the Screaming Starts! (1973) and The Vault of Horror (1973) for Hammer's rival, Amicus Productions.

Quatermass and the Pit continues to be generally well regarded among critics. John Baxter notes in Science Fiction in the Cinema that "Baker's unravelling of this crisp thriller is tough and interesting. [...] The film has moments of pure terror, perhaps the most effective that in which the drill operator, driven off the spaceship by the mysterious power within is caught up in a whirlwind that fills the excavation with a mass of flying papers." John Brosnan, writing in The Primal Scream, found that "as a condensed version of the serial, the film is fine but the old black-and-white version, though understandably creaky in places and with inferior effects, still works surprisingly well, having more time to build up a disturbing atmosphere." Bill Warren in Keep Watching the Skies! said: "The ambition of the storyline is contained in a well-constructed mystery that unfolds carefully and clearly." Nigel Kneale had mixed feelings about the end result "I was very happy with Andrew Keir, who they eventually chose, and very happy with the film. There are, however, a few things that bother me. ... The special effects in Hammer films were always diabolical."

It has been suggested that Tobe Hooper's 1985 Lifeforce is largely a remake of Hammer's Quatermass and the Pit. In an interview, director Tobe Hooper discussed how Cannon Films gave him $25 million, free rein, and Colin Wilson's book The Space Vampires. Hooper then shares how giddy he was: "I thought I'd go back to my roots and make a 70 mm Hammer film."

Home media release
Various DVDs of the film include a commentary from Nigel Kneale and Roy Ward Baker, as well as cast and crew interviews, trailers and an instalment of The World of Hammer TV series devoted to Hammer's forays into science fiction.

A UK Blu-ray was released on 10 October 2011, followed by releases in the US, Germany and Australia.

References

Notes

Bibliography

External links
 
 
 
 
 The Quatermass Trilogy – A Controlled Paranoia

1967 films
1967 horror films
1960s science fiction horror films
British science fiction horror films
British sequel films
Color sequels of black-and-white films
1960s English-language films
Films about ancient astronauts
Films about extraterrestrial life
Films based on television series
Films directed by Roy Ward Baker
Films set in London
Films set on the London Underground
Hammer Film Productions horror films
Quatermass
Films shot at MGM-British Studios
1960s British films